Dayaris Rosa Mestre Alvarez (Sancti Spíritus, 20 November 1986) is a Cuban judoka who competes in the women's 48 kg category. At the 2012 Summer Olympics, she was defeated in the second round. She lost the bronze medal match to Galbadrakhyn Otgontsetseg in the women's 48 kg event at the 2016 Summer Olympics.

References

External links

 
 

1986 births
Living people
Olympic judoka of Cuba
Judoka at the 2012 Summer Olympics
Judoka at the 2016 Summer Olympics
People from Sancti Spíritus
Cuban female judoka
Judoka at the 2011 Pan American Games
Judoka at the 2015 Pan American Games
Pan American Games gold medalists for Cuba
Pan American Games silver medalists for Cuba
Pan American Games medalists in judo
Universiade medalists in judo
Universiade bronze medalists for Cuba
Medalists at the 2013 Summer Universiade
Medalists at the 2011 Pan American Games
Medalists at the 2015 Pan American Games
20th-century Cuban women
21st-century Cuban women